Ludwig Maria Hugo (19 January 1871, Arzheim district, Landau in der Pfalz – 30 March 1935, Mainz) was a German Roman Catholic clergyman. From 1921 until his death he was Bishop of Mainz.

References

External links
http://www.catholic-hierarchy.org/bishop/bhugo.html 

1871 births
1935 deaths
Bishops of Mainz (1802-present)
People from Landau